The 1973 Argentine general election can refer to two presidential elections took place in Argentina during the year 1973:

March 1973 Argentine general election, a presidential election that took place on March 11, 1973
September 1973 Argentine presidential election, a presidential election that took place on September 23, 1973